The following is a list of massacres that have occurred in Lebanon (numbers may be approximate):

References

Lebanon
Massacres